In 2020 NASCAR will sanction four national series:
 2020 NASCAR Cup Series – the top racing series in NASCAR
 2020 NASCAR Xfinity Series – the second-highest racing series in NASCAR
 2020 NASCAR Gander RV & Outdoors Truck Series – the third-highest racing series in NASCAR
 2020 ARCA Menards Series – the top racing series in ARCA (owned by NASCAR)

Touring series
 eNASCAR iRacing Pro Invitational Series – The iRacing series that all-stars competed in during the COVID-19 pandemic.
 2020 ARCA Menards Series West – One of the two regional ARCA Series
 2020 ARCA Menards Series East – One of the two regional ARCA Series
 2020 NASCAR Whelen Modified Tour – The modified tour of NASCAR
 2020 NASCAR Whelen Euro Series – The top NASCAR racing series in Europe

 
NASCAR seasons